is a Japanese footballer currently playing as a defender for Zweigen Kanazawa.

Club career
Katakura made his professional debut in a 1–4 Emperor's Cup loss against Albirex Niigata.

Career statistics

Club
.

Notes

References

External links

1998 births
Living people
Association football people from Tochigi Prefecture
Josai University alumni
Japanese footballers
Association football defenders
Zweigen Kanazawa players